HSwMS Smyge was an experimental ship of the Swedish Navy used to test stealth technology launched in 1991. Experience from Smyge was used while planning the s. , Smyge is used for training at the Swedish Navy Academy.

References

External links

 page on Smyge
 

Ships built in Karlskrona
Experimental ships
1991 ships
Ships of the Swedish Navy